Aurskog-Høland is a municipality in Akershus in Viken county, Norway.  It is part of the Romerike traditional region.  The administrative centre of the municipality is the village of Bjørkelangen.  The municipality of Rømskog, in Østfold county was merged into Aurskog-Høland on January 1, 2020.

General information

Name 
The new municipality of Aurskog-Høland was created on 1 January 1966 after the merger of the four old municipalities of Aurskog, Nordre Høland, Søndre Høland, and Setskog.

The name Aurskog comes from the old Ør farm (Old Norse: Aurr which means "gravel"). The last element is skog (Old Norse: skógr which means "wood" therefore the meaning of the full name is "the woods around the farm Aurr".  Prior to 1918, the name was written "Urskog".

The name Høland is an old district name. The first element is høy which means "hay" and the last element is land which means "land".

Coat-of-arms 
The coat-of-arms is from modern times.  They were granted on 4 February 1983.  The arms show a black European crayfish (Astacus astacus) on a gold background.  It was derived from an older logo of the municipality. The logo showed a typical landscape of the area, a lake surrounded by woods and a crayfish in the lake. To place the whole composition in a shield to create the arms was not allowed according to Norwegian heraldic rules, so the crayfish was chosen as a symbol.

Demographics

Geography 
It is the biggest municipality in Akershus, covering . Main villages are Aurskog and Bjørkelangen, of which the latter one is the administrative center. Forests cover much of the area, but there is very good farmland as well. The rivers of Haldenvassdraget and Hølandselva run through the district.

Economy 
An important printing office, PDC Tangen AS and a crushing mill are situated here. Oslo is less than one hour's drive to the west.

The Think electric car was manufactured in Aurskog.

Notable people 

 Christian Christensen Kollerud (1767–1833) a farmer, rep. on Norwegian Constitutional Assembly
 Engebret Soot (1786–1859) a Norwegian engineer and canal builder
 Johan Vaaler (1866–1910) a Norwegian inventor and patent clerk
 Anders Heyerdahl (1832–1918) a Norwegian violinist, composer and folk music collector
 Betzy Akersloot-Berg (1850–1922) a seascape and landscape painter, lived in Vlieland 
 Gunnar Nordbye (1888–1977) a United States district judge in Minnesota.
 Anette Tønsberg (born 1970) a speed skater, competed at the 1992 and 1998 Winter Olympics
 Lasse Ottesen (born 1974) a former ski jumper, silver medallist at the 1994 Winter Olympics
 Charlotte Frogner (born 1981) a Norwegian actress

Sister cities 
The following cities are twinned with Aurskog-Høland:
  - Frederikssund, Region Hovedstaden, Denmark
  - Kumla, Örebro County, Sweden
  - Sipoo, Etelä-Suomi, Finland

See also 
 Urskog–Høland Line

References

External links 

 Municipal fact sheet from Statistics Norway
 

 
Municipalities of Akershus
Municipalities of Viken (county)
Populated places established in 1966
1966 establishments in Norway